Fred William Marler Jr. (April 6, 1932 - September 19, 1998) was an American politician and judge.

California Senate
Marler served in the California State Senate for the 5th district from 1965 to 1967 and the 2nd district from 1967 to 1974.

References

1932 births
1998 deaths
Republican Party California state senators
20th-century American politicians
United States Air Force personnel of the Korean War
University of California, Berkeley alumni